Nordausques is a commune in the Pas-de-Calais department in the Hauts-de-France region of France.

Geography
Nordqusques lies about 10 miles (16 km) northwest of Saint-Omer, at the junction of the N43, the D191 and the D218 roads, half a mile from junction 2 of the A26 autoroute, on the banks of the small river Hem.

Population

Places of interest
 The church of St. Martin, dating from the nineteenth century.
 The manor house at Welle, dating from the sixteenth century.

See also
Communes of the Pas-de-Calais department

References

External links

 Official website 

Communes of Pas-de-Calais